Tongkang or "Tong'kang" refers to several type of boats used to carry goods along rivers and shoreline in Maritime Southeast Asia. One of the earliest record of tongkang has a background of 14th century, being mentioned in Malay Annals which was composed no earlier than 17th century. One passage mentioned it as being used by Majapahit empire during the 1350 attack on Singapura.

Etymology 
Because the majority of tongkangs were built, used, and manned by Chinese people, it is frequently assumed that the name was Chinese word. In fact, "tongkang" is certainly a Malay word, and probably derived from bělongkang (properly përahu bèlongkang, a pěrahu jalur with strakes added to increase the freeboard), a word which was formerly used in Sumatra for a river cargo boat.

Description
The tongkang was an unmotorised open cargo boat, propelled by a variety of methods, including rowing, punt poles and sail. 
 
The early tongkangs were about 20 ton burthen or less; they were propelled by about ten rowers and guided by a steersman. Long punt poles were used to propel them in shallower water. The size of the tongkang increased around 1860.

The tongkang was one of the two traditional Malay ships using junk rig with local hulls instead of the Chinese Junk hull. Its hull design was more reminiscent of the dhow type used in South Asia and Western Asia than to the common Chinese or Far-eastern type. Besides the Junk Rig, the ketch rig was also used on the tongkang. The last tongkangs in Singapore were towed by a motorised launch.

Types of tongkang 
Because the term "tongkang" is applied to several type of boats, the description of each boat is not necessarily the same.

Malaya 

Tamil-manned lighter, brought to Singapore in the 1820s.
The old Singapore sailing lighter. Originally the Tamil-manned lighter, brought to Singapore in the 1820s. Later a western-style lighter hull, double-ended, usually with a single mast setting a large loose-footed dipping lugsail, and frequently manned by Chinese. These latter boats still survive, but they are no longer propelled by sails.
 Tongkang tunda, meaning "towed tongkang". European-style lighter hull, double-ended, usually with a single mast setting a large loose-footed dipping lugsail, and frequently manned by Chinese. These boats still survive, but they are no longer propelled by sails.
 Tongkang Melayu, manned by Malays. Typically a double-ended lighter hull, ketch-rigged with standing gaffs and two headsails. No stern gallery and a western style rudder. Some had transom sterns.
 Penang sailing lighter. Western-style lighter hull, with a transom stern and 1 mast with a large loose-footed dipping lugsail and a single headsail, or a bermuda-headed mainsail and one headsail. Formerly also double-ended, generally with 2 masts, setting a large lugsail on the mainmast. No stern gallery and a western style rudder. Normally manned by men from southern India.
Singapore timber tongkang. A heavy, wide hull with a transom stern, 2 masts and with a long bowsprit. They are ketch-rigged with standing gaffs, no topsails, two or three headsails. A stern gallery and Chinese rudder. Manned by Chinese.
 Singapore trader: General purpose trading boat, now used mostly for carrying firewood. Hull similar to Singapore timber tongkang, but less beamy: stepping two or three masts, each setting a single highpeaked Chinese junk sail. Manned by Chinese. Hull length: .

Brunei 

 Tongkang. Manned by Malays. Medium-sized, double-ended cargo boat, decked fore and aft, with a deckhouse amidship. It has a stern gallery and 1 mast, setting a square-sail or a dipping lug. Built at Sepitang and Brunei. The local cargo-carrier of Labuan Bay, occasionally found as far north as Jesselton. Hull length: .

North Borneo 

 Tongkang Melayu. Western-style hull with transom stern, had 1 or 2 masts, each setting a large dipping lugsail. No bowsprit, usually one headsail. Steered with an unpierced rudder. This boat, which is used for collecting firewood in Sandakan Bay, is very similar to the transom-stern Penang Lighter in broad outline, though rather beamier. It is made by Banjars (Malays) on Nunuyan Laut Island, in Sandakan Bay. Hull length: .
Tongkang China. The name used in the North Borneo ports for visiting Chinese junks (usually arriving from Hongkong).

Tongkangs in Singapore
There are references to the activity of these boats in Singapore, where a Chinese document, refers to the Southern bank around Read Bridge area, as cha chun tau (柴船头), meaning "jetty for boats carrying firewood". Small tongkangs carrying firewood from the Indonesian archipelago berthed at this jetty. The firewood trade was primarily a Teochew enterprise.

A tongkang in full sail appeared on the reverse of the 1990 and 1992 Singapore dollar 2 $ currency notes. Tongkang LRT station was named after this boat.

Another boat used on the Singapore River along with the tongkang was the twakow. These traditional vessels began to disappear around the 1930s, following the introduction of motor-powered boats and contemporary-type lighters.

See also
Junk Rig
Tongkang Pechah
Sampan panjang
Jong

References

External links 

Pictures of moored tongkangs and twakows in old Singapore
 Junk and Advanced Cruising Rig Association
Stephen Dobbs, Urban Redevelopment and the Forced Eviction of Lighters from the Singapore River Causes and impact of the "eviction" of the lighterage industry from the Singapore River in 1983.

Boat types
Water transport in Singapore
14th-century ships
Tall ships